Taylor County Airport  is a county-owned public-use airport located three nautical miles (6 km) southeast of the central business district of Medford, a city in Taylor County, Wisconsin, United States.

It is included in the Federal Aviation Administration (FAA) National Plan of Integrated Airport Systems for 2021–2025, in which it is categorized as a basic general aviation facility. Although no commercial airlines service the airport, it does serve general aviation traffic including business and leisure fliers. Hangars are available for lease and fuel is also available.

Although most U.S. airports use the same three-letter location identifier for the FAA and IATA, this airport is assigned MDZ by the FAA and MDF by the IATA (which assigned MDZ to El Plumerillo Airport in Mendoza, Argentina).

Facilities and aircraft 
It has two asphalt paved runways: 9/27 is 6,000 by 100 feet (1,829 x 30m) with approved GPS approaches and 16/34 is 4,435 by 75 feet (1,352 x 23 m) also with approved GPS approaches.

For the 12-month period ending September 22, 2022, the airport had 7,020 aircraft operations, an average of 19 per day: 93% general aviation, 7% air taxi and less than 1% military.
In February 2023, there were 13 aircraft based at this airport: all 13 single-engine.

See also 
 List of airports in Wisconsin

References

External links 
 Taylor County Airport at Taylor County website
  at Wisconsin DOT Airport Directory
 

Airports in Wisconsin
Buildings and structures in Taylor County, Wisconsin